Albion Terrace may refer to:

 Albion Terrace, Evansville, a housing unit in the US city of Evansville, Indiana 
 Albion Terrace, Reading, a residential terrace in the English city of Reading